Nick Deacy (born 19 July 1953) is a Welsh former footballer who played as a striker.

He used to play for PSV Eindhoven, and won the UEFA Cup with them in 1978, coming on as a substitute in the second leg of the final.

After a spell with Vitesse Arnhem he signed for Hull City in 1980 and made 87 Football League appearances for them.

He was capped on 12 occasions by the Wales national football team, and he scored on his debut for them against European champions Czechoslovakia in March 1977.

References

1953 births
Living people
Footballers from Cardiff
Welsh footballers
Wales international footballers
Wales under-23 international footballers
Hereford United F.C. players
PSV Eindhoven players
Hull City A.F.C. players
Happy Valley AA players
Double Flower FA players
Welsh expatriate sportspeople in Hong Kong
Bury F.C. players
Barry Town United F.C. players
English Football League players
Eredivisie players
Belgian Pro League players
Welsh expatriate footballers
Welsh expatriate sportspeople in the Netherlands
Welsh expatriate sportspeople in Belgium
Expatriate footballers in the Netherlands
Expatriate footballers in Belgium
Expatriate footballers in Hong Kong
K. Beringen F.C. players
UEFA Cup winning players
Association football forwards
Ebbw Vale F.C. players